Ickesburg is a village in Perry County, Pennsylvania, United States at the junction of Routes 17 and 74. It is located on the Panther Creek, which flows into the Buffalo Creek, a tributary of the Juniata River. Ickesburg is within Saville Township and is an unincorporated community. Its ZIP code is 17037 and it is served by area codes 717 and 223.

References

Unincorporated communities in Pennsylvania
Unincorporated communities in Perry County, Pennsylvania